The Australian Wallabies first played against France (Les Bleus) in 1928, resulting in a win to Australia. They did not win again until 1968, although in recent years Australia have dominated the encounter and have historically won more matches and have a better points difference.

Summary

Overview

Records
Note: Date shown in brackets indicates when the record was or last set.

Results

List of series

Notes

References

External links
 Pick and Go Rugby test match database

 
Australia national rugby union team matches
France national rugby union team matches
Rugby union rivalries in France
Australia–France sports relations
Rugby union rivalries in Australia